7EP may refer to:

Music
 An extended play, whose disc diameter is often 7 inches
 7 (U2 EP), an EP by Irish rock band U2
 7 (Sixx:A.M. EP), an EP by American rock trio Sixx:A.M.
 7 (Lil Nas X EP), an EP by American rapper and singer Lil Nas X

Other
 Seventh East Press, an independent student newspaper at Brigham Young University

See also
 EP7, an EP by Autechre released in 1999